Pseudosmodingium is a genus of plants in the subfamily Anacardioideae of the cashew and sumac family Anacardiaceae.

Species
The Plant List recognises about 7 accepted species:
 Pseudosmodingium andrieuxii 
 Pseudosmodingium barkleyi 
 Pseudosmodingium multifolium 
 Pseudosmodingium perniciosum 
 Pseudosmodingium pterocarpum 
 Pseudosmodingium rhoifolium 
 Pseudosmodingium virletii

References

Anacardiaceae
Anacardiaceae genera